Boogaloo Joe is the third album by guitarist Joe Jones which was recorded in 1969 and released on the Prestige label.

Reception

Allmusic awarded the album 3 stars stating "It offers more dependable grooves in the same mold, though, mixing originals and covers".

Track listing 
All compositions by Joe Jones except where noted.
 "Boogaloo Joe" – 6:35
 "Don't Deceive Me (Please Don't Go)" (Chuck Willis) – 8:05 [note: on original LP release, this song was titled "People Are Talking"]
 "Boardwalk Blues" – 4:18
 "Dream On Little Dreamer" (Fred Burch, Jan Crutchfield) – 6:40
 "Atlantic City Soul" – 4:55 
 "6:30 Blues" – 6:22

Personnel 
Joe Jones – guitar
Rusty Bryant – tenor saxophone
Sonny Phillips – organ, electric piano
Eddie Mathias – electric bass
Bernard Purdie – drums

References 

Boogaloo Joe Jones albums
1969 albums
Prestige Records albums
Albums recorded at Van Gelder Studio
Albums produced by Bob Porter (record producer)